In enzymology, a dihydrouracil dehydrogenase (NAD+) is an enzyme that catalyzes the chemical reaction

5,6-dihydrouracil + NAD+  uracil + NADH + H+

Thus, the two substrates of this enzyme are 5,6-dihydrouracil and NAD+, whereas its 3 products are uracil, NADH, and H+.

This enzyme belongs to the family of oxidoreductases, specifically those acting on the CH-CH group of donor with NAD+ or NADP+ as acceptor.  The systematic name of this enzyme class is 5,6-dihydrouracil:NAD+ oxidoreductase. Other names in common use include dehydrogenase, dihydrouracil, dihydropyrimidine dehydrogenase, dihydrothymine dehydrogenase, pyrimidine reductase, thymine reductase, uracil reductase, and dihydrouracil dehydrogenase (NAD+).  This enzyme participates in 3 metabolic pathways: pyrimidine metabolism, beta-alanine metabolism, and pantothenate and coa biosynthesis.

References 

 

EC 1.3.1
NADH-dependent enzymes
Enzymes of unknown structure